LMHS may refer to:
Linda Marquez High School, Huntington Park, California, United States 
 La Marque High School, La Marque, Texas (Greater Houston)
 La Mirada High School, La Mirada, California
 Lake Marion High School & Technology Center, Santee, South Carolina, United States
 Lake Mary High School, Lake Mary, Florida, United States
 Lake Minneola High School, Minneola, Florida, United States
 Laurier Macdonald High School, Montreal, Quebec, Canada
 Linden-McKinley High School, Columbus, Ohio, United States
 Linn-Mar High School, Marion, Iowa, United States
 Little Miami High School, Morrow, Ohio, United States
 Lloyd Memorial High School, Erlanger, Kentucky, United States
 Louisville Male High School, Louisville, Kentucky, United States
 Lower Merion High School, Ardmore, Pennsylvania, United States
 Lyman Memorial High School, Lebanon, Connecticut, United States